The 1984 NBL season was the sixth season of the National Basketball League (NBL). With the Melbourne Tigers joining the competition, the league's number of teams increased to 17, with nine teams in the Eastern Division and eight teams in the Western Division. The regular season began on 3 February and ended on 17 June. The finals began on 22 June with the divisional finals before concluding on 1 July with the NBL Grand Final.

Regular season

Round 1

|- bgcolor="#CCCCFF" font size=1
!width=90| Date
!width=180| Home
!width=60| Score
!width=180| Away
!width=260| Venue
!width=70| Crowd
!width=70| Box Score

Round 2

|- bgcolor="#CCCCFF" font size=1
!width=90| Date
!width=180| Home
!width=60| Score
!width=180| Away
!width=260| Venue
!width=70| Crowd
!width=70| Box Score

Round 3

|- bgcolor="#CCCCFF" font size=1
!width=90| Date
!width=180| Home
!width=60| Score
!width=180| Away
!width=260| Venue
!width=70| Crowd
!width=70| Box Score

Round 4

|- bgcolor="#CCCCFF" font size=1
!width=90| Date
!width=180| Home
!width=60| Score
!width=180| Away
!width=260| Venue
!width=70| Crowd
!width=70| Box Score

Round 5

|- bgcolor="#CCCCFF" font size=1
!width=90| Date
!width=180| Home
!width=60| Score
!width=180| Away
!width=260| Venue
!width=70| Crowd
!width=70| Box Score

Round 6

|- bgcolor="#CCCCFF" font size=1
!width=90| Date
!width=180| Home
!width=60| Score
!width=180| Away
!width=260| Venue
!width=70| Crowd
!width=70| Box Score

Round 7

|- bgcolor="#CCCCFF" font size=1
!width=90| Date
!width=180| Home
!width=60| Score
!width=180| Away
!width=260| Venue
!width=70| Crowd
!width=70| Box Score

Round 8

|- bgcolor="#CCCCFF" font size=1
!width=90| Date
!width=180| Home
!width=60| Score
!width=180| Away
!width=260| Venue
!width=70| Crowd
!width=70| Box Score

Round 9

|- bgcolor="#CCCCFF" font size=1
!width=90| Date
!width=180| Home
!width=60| Score
!width=180| Away
!width=260| Venue
!width=70| Crowd
!width=70| Box Score

Round 10

|- bgcolor="#CCCCFF" font size=1
!width=90| Date
!width=180| Home
!width=60| Score
!width=180| Away
!width=260| Venue
!width=70| Crowd
!width=70| Box Score

Round 11

|- bgcolor="#CCCCFF" font size=1
!width=90| Date
!width=180| Home
!width=60| Score
!width=180| Away
!width=260| Venue
!width=70| Crowd
!width=70| Box Score

Round 12

|- bgcolor="#CCCCFF" font size=1
!width=90| Date
!width=180| Home
!width=60| Score
!width=180| Away
!width=260| Venue
!width=70| Crowd
!width=70| Box Score

Round 13

|- bgcolor="#CCCCFF" font size=1
!width=90| Date
!width=180| Home
!width=60| Score
!width=180| Away
!width=260| Venue
!width=70| Crowd
!width=70| Box Score

Round 14

|- bgcolor="#CCCCFF" font size=1
!width=90| Date
!width=180| Home
!width=60| Score
!width=180| Away
!width=260| Venue
!width=70| Crowd
!width=70| Box Score

Round 15

|- bgcolor="#CCCCFF" font size=1
!width=90| Date
!width=180| Home
!width=60| Score
!width=180| Away
!width=260| Venue
!width=70| Crowd
!width=70| Box Score

Round 16

|- bgcolor="#CCCCFF" font size=1
!width=90| Date
!width=180| Home
!width=60| Score
!width=180| Away
!width=260| Venue
!width=70| Crowd
!width=70| Box Score

Round 17

|- bgcolor="#CCCCFF" font size=1
!width=90| Date
!width=180| Home
!width=60| Score
!width=180| Away
!width=260| Venue
!width=70| Crowd
!width=70| Box Score

Ladder
The home-and-away regular season took place over 17 rounds between 3 February and 17 June, with nine teams in the Eastern Division and eight teams in the Western Division. Each team would play the other teams in their division twice and the teams in the opposing division once. This meant that Western Division teams played 23 games and Eastern Division teams played 24.

The NBL tie-breaker system as outlined in the NBL Rules and Regulations states that in the case of an identical win–loss record, the results in games played between the teams will determine order of seeding.

1Head-to-Head between Coburg Giants and Newcastle Falcons (1-1). Coburg Giants won For and Against (+4).

2Head-to-Head between Melbourne Tigers and West Adelaide Bearcats (1-1). Melbourne Tigers won For and Against (+9).

3Head-to-Head between Bankstown Bruins and Frankston Bears (1-1). Bankstown Bruins won For and Against (+13).

4Head-to-Head between Canberra Cannons and Adelaide 36ers (1-1). Canberra Cannons won For and Against (+7).

5Head-to-Head between Hobart Devils and Devonport Warriors (1-1). Hobart Devils won For and Against (+1).

Finals

Playoff bracket

The NBL finals series in 1984 consisted of the elimination-style divisional finals, two semi-final games, and one championship-deciding grand final.

Divisional Elimination Finals
The top four teams in each division competed in a 1v2/3v4 elimination finals fixture, with the loser of 1v2 playing the winner of 3v4 for a spot in the Semi-finals, while the winner of 1v2 qualified through to the Semi-finals as well.

Western Division

|- bgcolor="#CCCCFF" font size=1
!width=90| Date
!width=180| Home
!width=60| Score
!width=180| Away
!width=260| Venue
!width=70| Crowd
!width=70| Box Score

|- bgcolor="#CCCCFF" font size=1
!width=90| Date
!width=180| Home
!width=60| Score
!width=180| Away
!width=260| Venue
!width=70| Crowd
!width=70| Box Score

Eastern Division

|- bgcolor="#CCCCFF" font size=1
!width=90| Date
!width=180| Home
!width=60| Score
!width=180| Away
!width=260| Venue
!width=70| Crowd
!width=70| Box Score

|- bgcolor="#CCCCFF" font size=1
!width=90| Date
!width=180| Home
!width=60| Score
!width=180| Away
!width=260| Venue
!width=70| Crowd
!width=70| Box Score

Semi-finals

|- bgcolor="#CCCCFF" font size=1
!width=90| Date
!width=180| Home
!width=60| Score
!width=180| Away
!width=260| Venue
!width=70| Crowd
!width=70| Box Score

Grand Final

|- bgcolor="#CCCCFF" font size=1
!width=90| Date
!width=180| Home
!width=60| Score
!width=180| Away
!width=260| Venue
!width=70| Crowd
!width=70| Box Score

Awards

Statistics leaders

Regular season
Most Valuable Player: Leroy Loggins (Brisbane Bullets)
Rookie of the Year: Andrew Gaze (Melbourne Tigers)
Coach of the Year: Brian Kerle (Brisbane Bullets)
All-NBL Team:
 Phil Smyth (Canberra Cannons)
 Leroy Loggins (Brisbane Bullets)
 Dan Clausen (Adelaide 36ers)
 James Crawford (Geelong Cats)
 Cal Bruton (Geelong Cats)

References

External links
"Back in the Day: Late Autumn 1984" at basketball.net.au

 
1984 in Australian basketball